Pringles or Coronel Pringles may refer to:

Pringles, a brand of potato snack
Pringles Park, a minor league baseball stadium located in Jackson, Tennessee, United States.
Coronel Pringles, a town in the south of the Buenos Aires Province in Argentina
Coronel Pringles Partido is a political division in Buenos Aires Province, Argentina
Coronel Pringles Department is a political division in San Luis Province, Argentina
Juan Pascual Pringles, a distinguished military leader in the Spanish American wars of independence